In mathematics, an algebraic torus, where a one dimensional torus is typically denoted by , , or , is a type of commutative affine algebraic group commonly found in projective algebraic geometry and toric geometry. Higher dimensional algebraic tori can be modelled as a product of algebraic groups . These groups were named by analogy with the theory of tori in Lie group theory (see Cartan subgroup). For example, over the complex numbers  the algebraic torus  is isomorphic to the group scheme , which is the scheme theoretic analogue of the Lie group . In fact, any -action on a complex vector space can be pulled back to a -action from the inclusion  as real manifolds.

Tori are of fundamental importance in the theory of algebraic groups and Lie groups and in the study of the geometric objects associated to them such as symmetric spaces and buildings.

Algebraic tori over fields 

In most places we suppose that the base field is perfect (for example finite or characteristic zero).

In general one has to use separable closures instead of algebraic closures.

Multiplicative group of a field 

Definition 

Let  be a field with algebraic closure .

The basic terminology associated to tori is as follows.

The integer  is called the rank or absolute rank of the torus .
The torus is said to be split over a field extension  if .
A torus is split if and only if its -rank equals its absolute rank.
A torus is said to be anisotropic if its -rank is zero.

Isogenies 

An isogeny between algebraic groups is a surjective morphism with finite kernel; two tori are said to be isogenous if there exists an isogeny from the first to the second. Isogenies between tori are particularly well-behaved: for any isogeny  there exists a "dual" isogeny  such that  is a power map. In particular being isogenous is an equivalence relation between tori.

Examples

Over an algebraically closed field 
Over any algebraically closed field  there is up to isomorphism a unique torus of any given rank. For a rank  algebraic torus over  this is given by the group scheme pg 230.

Over the real numbers 
Over the field of real numbers  there are exactly (up to isomorphism) two tori of rank 1:
the split torus 
the compact form, which can be realised as the unitary group  or as the special orthogonal group . It is an anisotropic torus. As a Lie group, it is also isomorphic to the 1-torus , which explains the picture of diagonalisable algebraic groups as tori.
Any real torus is isogenous to a finite sum of those two; for example the real torus  is doubly covered by (but not isomorphic to) . This gives an example of isogenous, non-isomorphic tori.

Over a finite field 
Over the finite field  there are two rank-1 tori: the split one, of cardinality , and the anisotropic one of cardinality . The latter can be realised as the matrix group

The kernel  of its field norm is also a torus, which is anisotropic and of rank . Any -torus of rank one is either split or isomorphic to the kernel of the norm of a quadratic extension.

Weights and coweights 

Over a separably closed field, a torus T admits two primary invariants. The functor given by taking weights is an antiequivalence of categories between tori and free abelian groups, and the coweight functor is an equivalence. In particular, maps of tori are characterized by linear transformations on weights or coweights, and the automorphism group of a torus is a general linear group over Z.  The quasi-inverse of the weights functor is given by a dualization functor from free abelian groups to tori, defined by its functor of points as:

This equivalence can be generalized to pass between groups of multiplicative type (a distinguished class of formal groups) and arbitrary abelian groups, and such a generalization can be convenient if one wants to work in a well-behaved category, since the category of tori doesn't have kernels or filtered colimits.

When a field K is not separably closed, the weight and coweight lattices of a torus over K are defined as the respective lattices over the separable closure.  This induces canonical continuous actions of the absolute Galois group of K on the lattices.  The weights and coweights that are fixed by this action are precisely the maps that are defined over K.  The functor of taking weights is an antiequivalence between the category of tori over K with algebraic homomorphisms and the category of finitely generated torsion free abelian groups with an action of the absolute Galois group of K.

Given a finite separable field extension L/K and a torus T over L, we have a Galois module isomorphism

If T is the multiplicative group, then this gives the restriction of scalars a permutation module structure.  Tori whose weight lattices are permutation modules for the Galois group are called quasi-split, and all quasi-split tori are finite products of restrictions of scalars.

Tori in semisimple groups

Linear representations of tori 

As seen in the examples above tori can be represented as linear groups. An alternative definition for tori is:

A linear algebraic group is a torus if and only if it is diagonalisable over an algebraic closure. 

The torus is split over a field if and only if it is diagonalisable over this field.

Split rank of a semisimple group 

If  is a semisimple algebraic group over a field  then:
The group is called anisotropic if it contains no split tori (i.e. its -rank is zero).

Classification of semisimple groups 

In the classical theory of semisimple Lie algebras over the complex field the Cartan subalgebras play a fundamental rôle in the classification via root systems and Dynkin diagrams. This classification is equivalent to that of connected algebraic groups over the complex field, and Cartan subalgebras correspond to maximal tori in these. In fact the classification carries over to the case of an arbitrary base field under the assumption that there exists a split maximal torus (which is automatically satisfied over an algebraically closed field). Without the splitness assumption things become much more complicated and a more detailed theory has to be developed, which is still based in part on the study of adjoint actions of tori.

If  is a maximal torus in a semisimple algebraic group  then over the algebraic closure it gives rise to a root system  in the vector space . On the other hand, if  is a maximal -split torus its action on the -Lie algebra of  gives rise to another root system .

The first step towards a classification is then the following theorem

Two semisimple -algebraic groups are isomorphic if and only if they have the same Tits indices and isomorphic anisotropic kernels. 

This reduces the classification problem to anisotropic groups, and to determining which Tits indices can occur for a given Dynkin diagram.

Tori and geometry

Flat subspaces and rank of symmetric spaces 

If  is a semisimple Lie group then its real rank is the -rank as defined above (for any -algebraic group whose group of real points is isomorphic to ), in other words the maximal  such that there exists an embedding .

It is in fact a maximal flat subspace and all maximal such are obtained as orbits of split tori in this way.

Q-rank of lattices 

If the Lie group  is obtained as the real points of an algebraic group  over the rational field  then the -rank of  has also a geometric significance. In particular,  is compact if and only if  is anisotropic.

Note that this allows to define the -rank of any lattice in a semisimple Lie group, as the dimension of its asymptotic cone.

Buildings 

Algebraic tori over an arbitrary base scheme

Definition 

Given a base scheme S, an algebraic torus over S is defined to be a group scheme over S that is fpqc locally isomorphic to a finite product of copies of the multiplicative group scheme Gm/S over S.  In other words, there exists a faithfully flat map X → S such that any point in X has a quasi-compact open neighborhood U whose image is an open affine subscheme of S, such that base change to U yields a finite product of copies of GL1,U = Gm/U.  One particularly important case is when S is the spectrum of a field K, making a torus over S an algebraic group whose extension to some finite separable extension L is a finite product of copies of Gm/L.  In general, the multiplicity of this product (i.e., the dimension of the scheme) is called the rank of the torus, and it is a locally constant function on S.

Most notions defined for tori over fields carry to this more general setting.

Examples 
One common example of an algebraic torus is to consider the affine cone  of a projective scheme .

Weights 

For a general base scheme S, weights and coweights are defined as fpqc sheaves of free abelian groups on S.  These provide representations of fundamental groupoids of the base with respect the fpqc topology.  If the torus is locally trivializable with respect to a weaker topology such as the etale topology, then the sheaves of groups descend to the same topologies and these representations factor through the respective quotient groupoids.  In particular, an etale sheaf gives rise to a quasi-isotrivial torus, and if S is locally noetherian and normal (more generally, geometrically unibranched), the torus is isotrivial.  As a partial converse, a theorem of Grothendieck asserts that any torus of finite type is quasi-isotrivial, i.e., split by an etale surjection.

Given a rank n torus T over S, a twisted form is a torus over S for which there exists a fpqc covering of S for which their base extensions are isomorphic, i.e., it is a torus of the same rank.  Isomorphism classes of twisted forms of a split torus are parametrized by nonabelian flat cohomology , where the coefficient group forms a constant sheaf.  In particular, twisted forms of a split torus T over a field K are parametrized by elements of the Galois cohomology pointed set  with trivial Galois action on the coefficients.  In the one-dimensional case, the coefficients form a group of order two, and isomorphism classes of twisted forms of Gm are in natural bijection with separable quadratic extensions of K.

Since taking a weight lattice is an equivalence of categories, short exact sequences of tori correspond to short exact sequences of the corresponding weight lattices.  In particular, extensions of tori are classified by Ext1 sheaves.  These are naturally isomorphic to the flat cohomology groups .  Over a field, the extensions are parametrized by elements of the corresponding Galois cohomology group.

Arithmetic invariants

In his work on Tamagawa numbers, T. Ono introduced a type of functorial invariants of tori over finite separable extensions of a chosen field k.  Such an invariant is a collection of positive real-valued functions fK on isomorphism classes of tori over K, as K runs over finite separable extensions of k, satisfying three properties:
 Multiplicativity: Given two tori T1 and T2 over K, fK(T1 × T2) = fK(T1) fK(T2)
 Restriction: For a finite separable extension L/K, fL evaluated on an L torus is equal to fK evaluated on its restriction of scalars to K.
 Projective triviality: If T is a torus over K whose weight lattice is a projective Galois module, then fK(T) = 1.

T. Ono showed that the Tamagawa number of a torus over a number field is such an invariant.  Furthermore, he showed that it is a quotient of two cohomological invariants, namely the order of the group  (sometimes mistakenly called the Picard group of T, although it doesn't classify Gm torsors over T), and the order of the Tate–Shafarevich group.

The notion of invariant given above generalizes naturally to tori over arbitrary base schemes, with functions taking values in more general rings.  While the order of the extension group is a general invariant, the other two invariants above do not seem to have interesting analogues outside the realm of fraction fields of one-dimensional domains and their completions.

See also

Toric geometry
Torus
Torus based cryptography
Hopf algebra

Notes

References 

A. Grothendieck, SGA 3 Exp. VIII–X
T. Ono, On Tamagawa Numbers
T. Ono, On the Tamagawa number of algebraic tori Annals of Mathematics 78 (1) 1963.
 
 

Linear algebraic groups
Lie groups